India–Iran relations are the bilateral relationship between the Republic of India and the Islamic Republic of Iran. Independent India and Iran established diplomatic relations on 15 March 1950, however ties between both ancient Persia and ancient India date back millennia. During much of the Cold War, relations between India and the erstwhile Imperial State of Iran suffered due to their differing political interests: India endorsed a non-aligned position but fostered strong links with the Soviet Union, while Iran was an open member of the Western Bloc and enjoyed close ties with the United States. While India did not welcome the 1979 Islamic Revolution, relations between the two states strengthened momentarily in its aftermath. However, Iran's continued support for Pakistan in the India–Pakistan conflict and India's close relations with Iraq during the Iran–Iraq War greatly strained bilateral ties. In the 1990s, both India and Iran supported the Northern Alliance against the Taliban in Afghanistan, the latter of which received overt Pakistani backing and ruled most of the country until the 2001 United States-led invasion. They continued to collaborate in supporting the broad-based anti-Taliban government, led by Ashraf Ghani and backed by the international community, until the Taliban captured Kabul in 2021 and re-established the Islamic Emirate of Afghanistan. India and Iran signed a defence cooperation agreement in December 2002.

From an economic perspective, Iran is the second-largest supplier of crude oil to India, supplying more than 425,000 barrels per day; consequently, India is one of the largest foreign investors in Iran's oil and gas industry. In 2011, the US$12 billion-worth annual oil trade between India and Iran was halted due to extensive economic sanctions against Iran, forcing the Indian oil ministry to pay off debt through a banking system via Turkey.

From a geopolitical perspective, despite the two countries having some common strategic interests, India and Iran differ significantly on key foreign policy issues. India has expressed strong opposition to Iran's nuclear program and while both nations continue to oppose the Taliban, India supported the presence of NATO-led forces in Afghanistan, unlike Iran.

According to a World Service Poll conducted by BBC at the end of 2005, 71 percent of Iranians viewed India's influence positively, with 21 percent viewing it negatively—the most favourable rating of India for any country in the world.

History
The Indian subcontinent and Iranian Plateau being adjacent geographical regions, Ancient India and Ancient Iran have had close relations dating back millennia. During the Middle Ages, there was fusion of medieval Persian culture in India, especially since the Delhi Sultanate till the period of Mughal Hindustan. In modern age, after the Partition of India in 1947, the newly independent India was no longer a neighboring country to the State of Iran, although the relations between both the nations still remained healthy.

Current relations

India and Iran have friendly relations in many areas, despite India not welcoming the 1979 Revolution. There are significant trade ties, particularly in crude oil imports into India and diesel exports to Iran. Iran frequently objected to Pakistan's attempts to draft anti-India resolutions at international organisations such as the OIC and the Human Rights Commission. India welcomed Iran's inclusion as an observer state in the SAARC regional organisation.
A growing number of Iranian students are enrolled at universities in India, most notably in Pune and Bengaluru. The clerical government in Tehran sees itself as a leader of Shiites worldwide, including India. Indian Shiites enjoy state support such as a recognised national holiday for Muharram. Lucknow continues to be a major centre of Shiite culture and Persian study in the subcontinent.

In the 1990s, India and Iran supported the Northern Alliance in Afghanistan against the Taliban regime. They continue to collaborate in supporting the abroad-based anti-Taliban government led by Ashraf Ghani and backed by the United States. The two countries signed a defence cooperation agreement in December 2002.

In 2010, Iran's Supreme Leader, Ayatollah Ali Khamenei, appealed to Muslims worldwide to back the freedom struggle in Jammu and Kashmir. India in turn, summoned the acting Iranian ambassador in New Delhi to lodge a formal protest.

In August 2013, while carrying oil in the Persian Gulf, Iran detained India's largest ocean liner Shipping Corporation (SCI)'s vessel MT Desh Shanti carrying crude oil from Iraq. Iran was resolute, and insisted the detention of the tanker was "a technical and non-political issue".

On 22 May 2016, Prime minister Narendra Modi paid an official visit to Iran. The visit focused on bilateral connectivity and infrastructure, an energy partnership, and trade.

Just before Prime Minister Narendra Modi's visit to Israel in July 2017, Iran's Supreme Leader Ayatollah Khamenei, urged the Muslims in Kashmir to 'repudiate oppressors'.

Economic relations

Iran's trade with India exceeded US$13 billion in 2007, an 80% increase in trade volume within a year.
Via third party countries such as UAE this figure reaches $30 billion.

Oil and gas 
In 2008–09, Iranian oil accounted for nearly 16.5% of India's crude oil imports. Indian oil imports from Iran increased by 9.5% in 2008–09 due to which Iran emerged as India's second largest oil supplier. About 40% of the refined oil consumed by India is imported from Iran. In June 2009, Indian oil companies announced their plan to invest US$5 billion in developing an Iranian gas field in the Persian Gulf. In September 2009, the Mehr news agency reported a Pakistani diplomat as saying "India definitely quitted the IPI (India-Pakistan-Iran) gas pipeline deal", in favour of the India–United States Civil Nuclear Agreement for energy security. Iranian officials however said India is yet to make an official declaration. In 2010, US officials warned New Delhi that Indian companies using the Asian Clearing Union for financial transactions with Iran run the risk of violating a recent US law that bans international firms from doing business with Iranian banks and Tehran's oil and gas sector, and that Indian companies dealing with Iran in this manner may be barred from the US. The United States criticises the ACU of being insufficiently transparent in its financial dealings with Iran and suspects that much of their assets are funnelled to blacklisted organisations in Iran such as the Islamic Revolutionary Guard Corps. The United States Department of the Treasury also believes that Iran uses the ACU to bypass the US banking system. On 27 November 2010, the Indian government, through the Reserve Bank of India, instructed the country's lenders to stop processing current-account transactions with Iran using the Asian Clearing Union, and that further deals should be settled without ACU involvement. RBI also declared that they will not facilitate payments for Iranian crude imports as global pressure on Tehran grows over its nuclear programme. This move by the Indian government will make clear to Indian companies that working through the ACU "doesn't necessarily mean an Iranian counterpart has an international seal of approval". As of December 2010, neither Iran nor the ACU have responded to this development. India objected to further American sanctions on Iran in 2010. An Indian foreign policy strategist, Rajiv Sikri, dismissed the idea that a nuclear armed Iran was a threat to India, and said that India would continue to invest in Iran and do business. Despite increased pressure by the US and Europe, and a significant reduction in oil imports from Persian oil fields in 2012, leading political figures in India have clearly stated that they are not willing to stop trade relations altogether. To the contrary, they aim at expanding the commodity trade with the Islamic republic.

Renewed increase in oil imports 
While overall, India's total volume of imported crude has only been rising slightly from 3.2 million b/d in 2009–10 to 3.44 million b/d in 2012–13, imports from Iran have basically been fluctuating around 250,000 b/d from 2012 to 2013 and thus rising proportionally due to a halt for Iranian exports to Europe. The recent detainment of an Indian tanker by Iranian officials is unrelated to the oil embargo, but in an effort to save over US$8.5 billion in hard currency, and realising a 180-day waiver from US sanctions, India plans to increase Iranian imports by 11 million tons for 2014, in addition to the two million tons of crude oil shipped from Iran by June 2013, up 21.1% from last year.

On March 18, 2022, Iran's ambassador to India was quoted as stating that the country is ready to meet India's energy security demands, as talks between world powers and Tehran for the removal of sanctions against the OPEC member continue.

Iran's Nuclear Interests 
India, despite close relations and convergence of interests with Iran, voted against Iran in the International Atomic Energy Agency in 2005, which took Iran by surprise. A "welcoming prospect" Ali Larijani was reported as saying: "India was our friend".
Stephen Rademaker also acknowledged that India's votes against Iran at the International Atomic Energy Agency were "coerced":

"The best illustration of this is the two votes India cast against Iran at the IAEA. I am the first person to admit that the votes were coerced." 

The USA considers support from India – which is on 35-member board of Governors at the International Atomic Energy Agency – crucial in getting a sizeable majority for its proposal to refer the matter to the Security Council for positive punitive action against Iran. Greg Schulte, US ambassador to the IAEA, said "India's voice will carry particular weight...I hope India joins us in making clear our collective concerns about Iran's nuclear program". Schulte did not deny that the Indo-US nuclear deal was conditional to India supporting the US on the Iran issue. Appraising of the situation vis-a-vis Iran, a senior US official told the New York Times that The Indians are emerging from their non-aligned status and becoming a global power, and they have to begin to think about their responsibilities. They have to make a basic choice.. The Bush administration, however, recognized India's close relations with Iran and tempered its position, stating that India can "go ahead with a pipeline deal involving Iran and Pakistan. Our beef is with Iran, not the pipeline".

Infrastructure
A highway between Zaranj and Delaram (Zaranj-Delaram Highway) is being built with financial support from India. The Chabahar port has also been jointly financed by Iran and India. India alone plans to invest 20 Billion US dollars towards development of Chabahar port. India is helping develop the Chabahar Port, which will give it access to the oil and gas resources in Iran and the Central Asian states. By so doing, India hopes to compete with the Chinese, who are building Gwadar Port, in Pakistan's Balochistan. Iran plans to use Chabahar for trans-shipment to Afghanistan and Central Asia, while keeping the port of Bandar Abbas as a major hub mainly for trade with Russia and Europe. India, Iran and Afghanistan have signed an agreement to give Indian goods, heading for Central Asia and Afghanistan, preferential treatment and tariff reductions at Chabahar.

Work on the Chabahar-Milak-Zaranj-Delaram route from Iran to Afghanistan is in progress. Iran is, with Indian aid, upgrading the Chabahar-Milak road and constructing a bridge on the route to Zaranj. India's BRO is laying the 213 km Zaranj-Delaram road. It is a part of India's US$750 million aid package to Afghanistan. The Chabahar port project is Iran's chance to end its US-sponsored economic isolation and benefit from the resurgent Indian economy. Along with Bandar Abbas, Chabahar is the Iranian entrepot on the north–south corridor. A strategic partnership between India, Iran and Russia is intended to establish a multi-modal transport link connecting Mumbai with St Petersburg, providing Europe and the former Soviet republics of Central Asia access to Asia and vice versa.

North-South Transport Corridor

The North–South Transport Corridor is the ship, rail, and road route for moving freight between India, Russia, Iran, Europe, the Caucasus, and Central Asia. The route primarily involves moving freight from India, Iran, Azerbaijan and Russia via ship, rail and road. The objective of the corridor is to increase trade connectivity between major cities such as Mumbai, Moscow, Tehran, Baku, Bandar Abbas, Astrakhan, Bandar Anzali, etc. Dry runs of two routes were conducted in 2014, the first was Mumbai to Baku via Bandar Abbas and the second was Mumbai to Astrakhan via Bandar Abbas, Tehran and Bandar Anzali. The objective of the study was to identify and address key bottlenecks. The results showed transport costs were reduced by "$2,500 per 15 tons of cargo". Other routes under consideration include via Armenia, Kazakhstan and Turkmenistan.

Education
There are about 8,000 Iranian students studying in India. India provides 67 scholarships every year to Iranian students under ITEC, ICCR, Colombo Plan and IOR-ARC schemes. Every year around 40,000 Iranians visit India for various purposes.

Kendriya Vidyalaya Tehran, the Embassy of India School, serves Indian citizens living in Tehran.

Religion

The world's largest population of Zoroastrians are the Parsi community in India. During the Arab conquest of Persia, many Zoroastrians moved to the western coast of India and as a result the country has the largest population of Zoroastrians in the world. In the modern era, the Parsi community have contributed significantly to India in the areas of politics, industry, science and culture. Prominent Indian Parsis include Dadabhai Naoroji (three times president of Indian National Congress), Field Marshal Sam Manekshaw, nuclear energy scientist Homi Bhabha, industrialist JRD Tata and the Tata family. The rock star Freddie Mercury (lead singer of the band Queen) was an Indian Parsi born in Zanzibar. Zubin Mehta, a conductor of Western classical music orchestras, is also a Parsi originally from Mumbai.

See also

 Foreign relations of Iran
 Foreign relations of India
 Iran-Pakistan-India gas pipeline
 Ibn Sina Academy of Medieval Medicine and Sciences
 Indo-Persian culture
 Buddhism in Iran
 Hinduism in Iran
 Zoroastrianism in India
 Irani

References

Further reading
Chopra, R.M. Indo-Iranian Cultural Relations through the Ages. published by Iran Society, Kolkata.
Chopra, R.M. Indo-Iranian Cultural Relations in the 20th century. Indo-Iranica Vol.57 (1–4)
Clawson, Patrick. (2005). Eternal Iran: Continuity and Chaos. . 2005. MacMillan.
  (series of entries that cover Indian history and its relations with Iran)
Keddie, Nikki; Matthee, Rudolph P. (ed.). (2002). Iran and the Surrounding World: Interactions in Culture and Cultural Politics. University of Washington Press. .
Tikku, G.L. (1971). Persian poetry in Kashmir 1339–1846. 
Section on Persian literature in India: Jan Rypka, January (1968). History of Iranian Literature. Reidel Publishing Company. . 
Chopra, R.M., "The Rise Growth And Decline of Indo-Persian Literature", 2012, published by Iran Culture House, New Delhi and Iran Society, Kolkata. 2nd Edition published in 2013.
Maini,T.S., Sachdeva, S. What Does Iran’s Changing Foreign Policy Mean for India?, IndraStra Global Vol. 003, Issue No: 09 (2017), Article No: 0024, ISSN 2381-3652

External links
Official Embassy of India, Tehran
US concerns not to sway India-Iran relations
India-Iran Relations Cannot Be Hostage To US 
India-Iran Relations: Key Security Implications

 
Iran
Bilateral relations of Iran